Paul William Andrews (11 November 195522 October 2009) was an Australian politician. He was a Labor member of the Western Australian Legislative Assembly from 2001 to 2008, representing the electorate of Southern River.

Andrews entered parliament at the 2001 state election by defeating sitting Liberal MP Monica Holmes. He won re-election at the 2005 state election by defeating Holmes a second time.  Seeking a third term at the 2008 state election, Andrews lost his seat to Liberal candidate Peter Abetz.

Andrews had also battled kidney disease for years and championed organ transplant in the Western Australian State Parliament for his two terms. Andrews also voiced his passion for reform to the organ donation transplant laws in Western Australia.

Andrews died on 22 October 2009 from cancer at the age of 53, leaving behind a wife and three adult children.

References

 
 

                   

Australian Labor Party members of the Parliament of Western Australia
1955 births
2009 deaths
Members of the Western Australian Legislative Assembly
People from Bunbury, Western Australia
Deaths from cancer in Western Australia
20th-century Australian politicians
21st-century Australian politicians